Abdul Wahid Siddiqui is a Pakistani politician who is Member of Provincial Assembly Balochistan. (PB 18) and Chairman of Standing Committee For Education. And Served as education minister of Balochistan.

References

Living people
Politicians from Balochistan, Pakistan
Muttahida Majlis-e-Amal MPAs (Balochistan)
Year of birth missing (living people)

https://www.electionpakistani.com/ge2018/pb/PB-18.htm

https://pabalochistan.gov.pk/new/committee-details/

http://www.electionpakistani.com/ge2002/pb/PB-9.htm

https://pabalochistan.gov.pk/new/committee-details/

s/

http://www.electionpakistani.com/ge2002/pb/PB-9.htm